The American Committee on United Europe (ACUE), founded in 1948, was a private American organization that sought to counter communism in Europe by promoting European federalism. Its first chairman was former head of the Office of Strategic Services (OSS) William Joseph Donovan, who had left the government after the war and was in private law practice. 
The vice-chairman was Allen Welsh Dulles, who also had left the government and was in private practice. He later joined the Central Intelligence Agency (CIA) in 1951. Other board members were Walter Bedell Smith, who would later become the CIA's first director and Tom Braden, who was recruited by the OSS when the US entered the war.

The structure of the organization was outlined in early summer of 1948 by Donovan and Dulles in response to assistance requests by Richard von Coudenhove-Kalergi, then Joseph Retinger and Winston Churchill., and resembled that of the Free Europe Committee.

Declassified American government documents have shown that the ACUE received foundation money it used to help fund of both the European Movement and the European Youth Campaign. The ACUE itself received funding from the Rockefeller and Ford foundations.

American policy was to slowly pursue a United States of Europe. The committee was later used as a discreet way to funnel CIA funds (by the mid-1950s, ACUE was receiving roughly US$1,000,000 per year) to organizations supporting European federalism such as the Council of Europe, the European Coal and Steel Community, and the proposed European Defence Community.

See also
History of the European Communities (1945-1957)
United States of Europe

References

External links
 Archival sources on the American Committee for a United Europe can be consulted at the Historical Archives of the European Union in Florence

Central Intelligence Agency operations
Central Intelligence Agency front organizations
1945
Eurofederalism
Anti-communist organizations in the United States
Organizations established in 1948